Ihmiset suviyössä (People in the Summer Night) is a Finnish film from 1948. Directed by Valentin Vaala, it is based on Frans Eemil Sillanpää's 1934 novel of the same title.

Plot 

The film concentrates on the destinies of a small group of people during one summer night. All events in the film are told from two different perspectives. During the night people are falling in love, fighting drunk, dying, and being born. Nature is just as important a part of the movie as the actors are. The novelist Sillanpää himself had told Vaala to keep in mind that there should be only one main character, and that is the summer night.

Reception 

Ihmiset suviyössä received mostly positive reviews from Finnish critics. They especially praised Eino Heino's cinematography, stating that such beautiful and sensitive capturing of Finnish nature had never before been seen in domestic films.

The film received four Jussi Awards; in addition to actors Martti Katajisto, Eero Roine and Kaisu Leppänen, also Valentin Vaala and Lea Joutseno were awarded for the screenplay.

Main cast 

Eila Pehkonen as Telirannan Helka
Martti Katajisto as Nokia
Emma Väänänen as Syrjämäen Hilja
Eero Roine as Syrjämäen Jalmari
Matti Oravisto as Arvid
Toivo Hämeranta as Telirannan isäntä
Tyyne Haarla as Telirannan Martta-emäntä
Maija Nuutinen as Telirannan vanhaemäntä
Kaisu Leppänen as Mettälän Santra
Matti Lehtelä as Mettälän Jukka
Tarmo Manni as Iivari Pietilä

Commentary 

The character Nokia is considered to be the first gay character in Finnish cinema.

References

1948 films
Films based on Finnish novels
Finnish drama films
Finnish LGBT-related films
1948 drama films
Finnish black-and-white films
1940s Finnish-language films
1940s LGBT-related films